Umansky is a Ukrainian language locational surname, which means a person from Uman, Ukraine. The name may refer to:

Ellen Umansky (born 1950), American religious scholar
Jean Umansky, French sound engineer
Kaye Umansky (born 1946), British writer
Konstantin Umansky (1902–1945), Russian diplomat and writer
Laura Umansky (born 1979), American businesswoman
Leonid A. Umansky (1890–1957), Russian electrical engineer
Mikhail Umansky (1952–2010), Russian chess player

References

See also
 

Ukrainian-language surnames
Russian-language surnames